Capital punishment in Slovakia was abolished in 1990 and the most severe punishment permissible by law is life imprisonment. Before that, capital punishment was common in Czechoslovakia, the Slovak State, Austria-Hungary, the Kingdom of Hungary and probably all previous political entities that existed in the area of today's Slovakia. Since 1989, no one has been executed in Slovakia save for a few controversial political killings by the Slovak Secret Service in the 1990s. Since then, there have been no reports of the government or its agents committing arbitrary or unlawful killings.

Public opinion
A 2005 poll carried out by the MVK agency for the SME daily showed that 61.7 percent of respondents were in favour of reintroducing capital punishment.

References

See also 
 Life imprisonment in Slovakia

Slovak Republic
Law of Slovakia
Death in Slovakia
Human rights abuses in Slovakia